Lalomie (Lomie) Washburn (25 August 1941 – 18 December 2004) was a R&B singer and song writer.

She was born on August 25, 1941 in Memphis, Tennessee and went on to sing backup with such legends as Ray Charles, Ike & Tina Turner and Chaka Khan. She wrote songs for and with Rufus & Chaka Khan, New Birth, Buddy Miles, The Brothers Johnson and Aretha Franklin.

She signed with the Parachute label in 1977, where she released her first album My Music is Hot. She went on to launch a solo career, which drew a large following in Germany in the 1970s and 1980s. In 1992 she released several 12" singles, and in 1997 a second (self titled) solo album. She came back to Omaha to do a small tour when in her mid fifties.

She died on 18 Sept 2004 in Los Angeles. In 2005 she was inducted into the Omaha Black Music Hall of Fame.

References

2004 deaths
1941 births
Musicians from Memphis, Tennessee
Burials at Inglewood Park Cemetery
20th-century American singers
20th-century American women singers
21st-century American women
The Raelettes members